Dimitar Stefanov Stoyanov (26 November 1938 – 17 June 2011) was a Bulgarian stage actor, theatre director and assistant Professor.

Career

Born in Varna, he graduated high school in his hometown, after that graduated acting in NATFA in the class of Professor Filip Filipov, specializes directing in Moscow and Leningrad. He worked four years as an actor in Dobrich theatre and two years as a director in the theaters of Veliko Tarnovo and Pleven. Accepted the invitation of his professor to be his assistant and after winning a competition became a lecturer at NATFIZ. While specializing in the Soviet Union continued directing his commitment to theater "Tears and Laughter" (Сълза и смях). Since 1998 is a freelance made annually in several productions at various theaters in Bulgaria and abroad and always happy to return to his native city, where he raised the "Fisherman's Disputes" ("Рибарски свади") by Carlo Goldoni, "Dr." from Branislav Nušić "Cannibal Woman" ("Човекоядката") by Ivan Radoev. His last performances before his death are "Desire Under the Elms" by Eugene O'Neill and "Urnebesna Tragedija" (Урбулешка Трагедия) by Dusan Kovacevic.

Death 

Dimitar Stoyanov leave this world on June 17, 2011, the day after the premiere of play "Urbuleshka tragedy." He died on European route E772 from Varna to Sofia in the area around Strazhitsa after he was traveled to Sofia.The cause of his death was haemorrhagic stroke.

Filmography

References 

Bulgarian National Theatre Archive

External links 
 

1938 births
2011 deaths
Bulgarian male film actors
Bulgarian theatre directors
Bulgarian male stage actors
Actors from Varna, Bulgaria
20th-century Bulgarian male actors